James Raven (29 March 1908 – 2 January 1965) was an English professional footballer who played in the Football League for Brentford, Bristol Rovers and Wrexham as a right half.

Career 
A right half, Raven began his career at Second Division club Notts County and later dropped into non-League football to join Southern League Eastern Division club Folkestone. Raven returned to the Football League to join Second Division club Brentford in 1934. He made one appearance for the club, in a 0–0 draw with Nottingham Forest on 28 February 1935. Raven spent much of his time in the reserve team and won the 1934–35 London Challenge Cup with the team. He later played in both the Third Division North and South for Wrexham and Bristol Rovers respectively, before his career was brought to a halt by the outbreak of the Second World War.

Personal life 
Raven worked for Nottingham Co-operative Dairy for over 20 years.

Career statistics

Honours 
Brentford Reserves
 London Challenge Cup: 1934–35

References

1908 births
Footballers from Nottingham
English footballers
Brentford F.C. players
English Football League players
Folkestone F.C. players
Notts County F.C. players
Southern Football League players
Association football wing halves
Bristol Rovers F.C. players
Wrexham A.F.C. players
1965 deaths

Clapton Orient F.C. wartime guest players